Billie's Bounce (subtitled Dexter In Radioland Vol. 7) is a live album by American saxophonist Dexter Gordon recorded at the Jazzhus Montmartre in Copenhagen, Denmark in 1964 by Danmarks Radio and released on the SteepleChase label in 1979.

Critical reception 

AllMusic critic Scott Yanow stated "The well-recorded performances feature the great bop tenor in peak form and are easily recommended as is this entire Dexter in Radioland series".

Track listing 
 Introduction by Dexter Gordon – 0:28
 "Billie's Bounce" (Charlie Parker) – 17:17
 "Night in Tunisia" (Dizzy Gillespie) – 4:12
 Introduction by Dexter Gordon – 0:12
 "Satin Doll" (Duke Ellington, Billy Strayhorn, Johnny Mercer) – 16:21
 "Soul Sister" (Dexter Gordon) – 13:18

Personnel 
Dexter Gordon – tenor saxophone,
Tete Montoliu – piano
Niels-Henning Ørsted Pedersen – bass
Alex Riel – drums

References 

SteepleChase Records live albums
Dexter Gordon live albums
1983 live albums
Albums recorded at Jazzhus Montmartre